Comet Grigg–Skjellerup (formally designated 26P/Grigg–Skjellerup) is a periodic comet. It was visited by the Giotto probe in July 1992. The spacecraft came as close as 200 km, but could not take pictures because some instruments were damaged from its encounter with Halley's Comet.

The comet was discovered in 1902 by John Grigg of New Zealand, and rediscovered in its next appearance in 1922 by John Francis Skjellerup, an Australian then living and working for about two decades in South Africa where he was a founder member of the Astronomical Society of Southern Africa.

In 1987, it was belatedly discovered by Ľubor Kresák that the comet had been observed in 1808 as well, by Jean-Louis Pons.

The comet has often suffered the gravitational influence of Jupiter, which has altered its orbit considerably. For instance, its perihelion distance has changed from 0.77 AU in 1725 to 0.89 AU in 1922 to 0.99 AU in 1977 and to 1.12 AU in 1999.

In 1972 the comet was discovered to produce a meteor shower, the Pi Puppids, and its current orbit makes them peak around April 23, for observers in the southern hemisphere, best seen when the comet is near perihelion.

During the comet's 1982 it was detected using radar by the Arecibo Observatory.

Having its recent perihelion so close to Earth's orbit made it an easy target to reach for the Giotto mission (spacecraft) in 1992, whose primary mission was to Comet Halley. Giotto had a closest approach to Grigg–Skjellerup of 200 km, much closer than its approach to Comet Halley, but was unable to obtain images as its camera was destroyed during the Halley rendezvous in 1986.

The 2002 return (expected perihelion around October 8, 2002) was very unfavorable and no observations were reported.

The comet nucleus is estimated to be 2.6 kilometers in diameter.

The comet is a type locality for the mineral brownleeite.

Popular culture 
 In Neal Stephenson's science fiction novel Seveneves, 26P/Grigg–Skjellerup serves as a potential source of water and rocket propellant for the "Cloud Ark" survivors, and is frequently referred to by the nickname "Greg's Skeleton" by way of homophonic transformation.

References
 

 26P/Grigg–Skjellerup Cometography

External links
 Orbital simulation from JPL (Java) / Horizons Ephemeris
 26P/Grigg-Skjellerup – Seiichi Yoshida @ aerith.net
 ESA website about 26P/Grigg–Skjellerup
 Recovery of comet 26P/Grigg–Skjellerup (Remanzacco Observatory : December 26, 2012)

Periodic comets
0026
026P
Comets visited by spacecraft
Meteor shower progenitors
Geological type localities
Comets in 2013
Comets in 2018
19020723